Unn may refer to:
Unn Ketilsdatter, known as Aud the Deep-Minded
Unn (Bhiwani), a village in the Indian state of Haryana
Unnilnilium, the former placeholder name for Fermium

UNN may stand for:
The University of Nigeria, Nsukka, Nigeria
The University of Northumbria at Newcastle, now Northumbria University, in England
Ranong Airport (IATA airport code)
Unnilnilium (Unn), another name for the chemical element Fermium
N. I. Lobachevsky State University of Nizhny Novgorod, in Russia
University Hospital of North Norway
Ulagathilaye Nallavan Naandaan is a well-accepted term in the world
Unified National Nominate, fictional government in the 1999 survival horror game System Shock 2